Hurricane Catarina, or Cyclone Catarina was an extraordinarily rare South Atlantic tropical cyclone, the only hurricane-strength storm on record in the South Atlantic Ocean. Catarina made landfall on South Brazil at peak intensity, with the equivalent of Category 2 hurricane-force sustained winds, on 28 March 2004.

The storm developed out of a stationary cold-core upper-level trough on 12 March. Almost a week later, on 19 March, a disturbance developed along the trough and traveled towards the west-southwest until 22 March when a ridge stopped the forward motion of the disturbance. The disturbance was in an unusually favorable environment with a slightly below-average wind shear and above-average sea surface temperatures. The combination of the two led to a slow transition from an extratropical cyclone to a subtropical cyclone by 24 March. The storm continued to obtain tropical characteristics and became a tropical storm the next day while the winds steadily increased. The storm attained wind speeds of —equivalent to a low-end Category 1 hurricane on the Saffir–Simpson scale—on 26 March. At that time, it was unofficially named Catarina and was also the first hurricane-strength tropical cyclone ever recorded in the Southern Atlantic Ocean. The center of the storm made landfall between the cities of Passo de Torres and Balneário Gaivota, Santa Catarina soon afterward. Catarina rapidly weakened upon landfall and dissipated later that day.

Catarina was the first tropical cyclone to make landfall in Brazil since the beginning of reliable records; hence, the infrastructure and population were not specifically prepared for it, which led to severe damage. Although the storm was an unprecedented event, Brazilian officials took the appropriate actions and warned the public about the approaching storm. Residents heeded the warnings and prepared for the storm by either evacuating or by riding it out in their homes. Catarina ended up destroying 1,500 homes and damaging around 40,000 others. Agricultural products were severely damaged: 85% of the banana crops and 40% of the rice crops were lost in the storm. Three people were confirmed to have perished in the storm and 185 others were injured. Damages from the storm amounted to US$350 million (value in 2004).

Meteorological history 

On 12 March, a cold-core stationary upper-level trough became established offshore of southern Brazil. A disturbance formed within the trough on the 19 March, and moved east-southeastward until 22 March, when a ridge to its southeast kept it stationary.

A compact storm, the cyclone continued westward while steadily intensifying. The structure of the storm continued to improve, and due to a definite eye feature showing on satellites, the storm was determined to have become a hurricane-equivalent cyclone on 26 March. The storm attained wind speeds of —equivalent to a low-end Category 1 hurricane on the Saffir–Simpson Hurricane wind scale (SSHWS)—on 26 March, making the cyclone the first hurricane-strength tropical cyclone ever recorded in the Southern Atlantic Ocean. Around this time, a Brazilian newspaper had a headline "Furacão Catarina" (i.e. "hurricane [threatening the state of Santa] Catarina"). Partially because of this headline, the storm was unofficially named Catarina. Soon afterward, the hurricane made landfall on the southern coast of Santa Catarina and northeastern Rio Grande do Sul, with winds up to  overnight. After making landfall, Catarina rapidly weakened over land, in the normal manner of a tropical cyclone, dissipating later that day.

Naming 

Brazilian meteorologists named the storm Catarina for its proximity to (and eventual landfall near) the state of Santa Catarina, although government forecasters initially denied that the storm, which clearly had an open eye and various other tropical morphologies, was a hurricane at all. More than a year after the storm made landfall, Brazilian meteorologists finally classified the storm as a tropical cyclone.

North American forecasters, however surprised as they were, considered this storm a hurricane immediately upon reviewing the satellite-derived evidence.

Though it is most commonly known as Catarina, all names for this storm are "unofficial", in that it was not named by any hurricane-monitoring meteorological agency affiliated with the World Meteorological Organization (WMO). (Tropical cyclone names are predetermined by an international committee of the WMO.) It has also been unofficially called "Aldonça", and the advisory names for it were "01T-ALPHA" from the United Kingdom's Met Office, and "50L-NONAME" from the United States' National Hurricane Center, which keeps it well outside normal designation, which start at 01L for named storms and use 90L to 99L for invests.

Rare formation 
Typically, tropical cyclones do not form in the South Atlantic Ocean, due to strong upper level shear, cool water temperatures, and the lack of a convergence zone of convection. Occasionally though, as seen in 1991 and early 2004, conditions can become slightly more favorable. For Catarina, it was a combination of climatic and atmospheric anomalies.

Catarina remains the only hurricane strength tropical cyclone ever observed in the South Atlantic Ocean (reliable continuous and relatively comprehensive records only began with the satellite era beginning about 1970). Other systems have been observed in this region; however, none have reached hurricane strength. While Catarina formed in an unusual area, its relation to global warming or any other type of global climatic change is still up for debate. The  attributed it to "climatic changes and atmospheric anomalies", while other researchers have indicated that it could be the result of the Southern Annular Mode or other seasonal variations in weather within the Southern Hemisphere, again linked to global changes in climate. However, more research in the area is still needed to make a conclusion.

Impact 

Like normal tropical cyclones, Catarina brought heavy flooding with it. Despite the uncertainty in the future of the storm, Brazilian officials took the appropriate actions to ensure the safety of the residents who lived along the coastline. A successful evacuation was executed for numerous residents along the coast, though some people decided to ride out the storm in their own homes. The storm damaged around 40,000 homes and destroyed 1,500; 40% of the rice crop were also lost. Total damages were estimated at $350 million (2004 USD). It also killed at least three and injured at least 75. At least 2,000 people were left homeless following the storm.

At Passo de Torres, many shipyards were destroyed, as they were not designed to withstand the pressure differentials caused by Catarina's winds; widespread roof damage was reported at this municipality as well. In rural areas, the corn, banana, and rice fields received the most damage, although rice farmers were able to partially recoup their losses, as they had harvested before Catarina made landfall.

Overall, almost 36,000 residences were damaged as a result of Catarina's onslaught; of those, 993 collapsed completely. The commercial sector fared slightly better, as only 2,274 buildings were damaged and 472 collapsed. Finally, 397 public buildings were damaged and three were destroyed. These account for 26% of the total buildings in the region, which amounted to property damage of US$25.6 million (value in 2004). Four-fifths of the damaged houses had some sort of roof failure or collapse. Most of the damage was blamed on the low quality of the construction; brick residences typically lacked plaster, beams, or columns, for example. The areas affected the most were those inhabited by low-income families, usually with annual family incomes of less than US$400.

Many studies were published out to measure Complex post-traumatic stress disorder, its symptoms and depression, focusing on cognition and biological indicators. As of 2013, there were no before-and-after studies of the 2004 Tsunami. The impact on children is considered particularly difficult to analyze because random assignments and double-blind procedures may not be possible or ethical for them, and therefore studies are usually limited to testing causal hypotheses.
A 2021 study found that the hurricane adversely affected children in utero, leading to reduced birth weight and increases in fetal deaths, possibly due to maternal stress.

See also 

 Subtropical Storm Arani (2011) – The first system officially named by the Brazilian Navy
 Mediterranean tropical-like cyclones
 Unusual areas of tropical cyclone formation
 2006 Central Pacific cyclone
 1996 Lake Huron cyclone
 Subtropical Cyclone Katie
 Subtropical Cyclone Lexi

References

Further reading

External links 

 Informal studies and summary pages
 Penn State write-up
 Workshop on the Phenomenon Catarina (Brazilian Society of Meteorology)
 Hurricane Catarina (Cooperative Institute for Meteorological Satellite Studies (CIMSS))
 NOAA satellite and Dvorak info
 Rare South Atlantic Tropical Cyclone (NASA)

 Media
 "First South Atlantic hurricane hits Brazil" (USA Today)

Catarina
Catarina
Catarina (2004)
Catarina
Catarina
Catarina
March 2004 events in South America
Catarina 
Catarina 
Catarina